KCOM (1550 AM) is a radio station licensed to serve Comanche, Texas, United States. The station is owned by Robert Elliott Jr., and the license is held by Villecom LLC.

History
In October 1998, Arrowhead Broadcasting, Inc., reached an agreement to sell this station to Texas West Media, Inc. The deal was approved by the FCC on December 10, 1998, and the transaction was consummated on February 1, 1999.

In February 2005, Texas West Media, Inc. (David B. Bacon, president/director) reached an agreement to sell this station to Cherry Creek Radio (Joseph D. Schwartz, CEO/president), through their CCR-Stephenville III, LLC, holding company, for a reported sale price of $164,000. The deal was approved by the FCC on August 2, 2005, and the transaction was consummated on September 30, 2005. At the time of the sale, the station aired a country music format.

Effective November 6, 2015, KCOM (along with co-owned KSTV, KSTV-FM, and KYOX) was sold to Robert Elliott, Jr.'s Villecom LLC for $1.11 million.

References

External links
KCOM official website

COM
Comanche County, Texas
Radio stations established in 1998